Sergej Grecicho, or in Lithuanian Sergejus Grečicho, is a Lithuanian Combat Sambo practitioner, and mixed martial artist who has won six medals, three of them gold, in Combat Sambo divisions at the Sambo World Championships. He also was World Pankration Champion and was a runner-up at the European BJJ championships.  He was honored at a ceremony by the mayor of Vilnius for his combat sambo world championships.

Career
Sergej Grecicho began Sambo and grappling around at the age of 10 becoming competitive soon later and made his mixed martial arts debut in 2005. After building up a record of 11–5, he went on 9 fight win streak, moving up to 20–5 mostly winning by submission. S. Grecicho had entered into a contract with Bellator, but never fought there. He is under a contract with ACB right now.

Mixed martial arts record

|-
| Loss
| align=center| 25-11-1
| Ivan Buchinger
| Submission (d'arce choke)
| XFN 15
| 
| align=center| 4
| align=center| 4:11
| Prague, Czech Republic
| For the X Fight Nights Featherweight Championship.
|-
| Loss
| align=center| 25-10-1
| Alihan Suleimanov
| Decision (Unanimous)
|ACB 83: Borisov vs. Kerimov
|
| align=center| 3
| align=center| 5:00
|Baku, Azerbaijan
| 
|-
| Win
| align=center| 25-9-1
| Miroslav Strbak
| Submission (heel hook)
| STB: Simply The Best & Rebuy Stars Fight Night
| 
| align=center| 3
| align=center| 4:05
| Košice, Slovakia
|
|-
| Win
| align=center| 24-9-1
| Yusup Umarov
| Submission (kneebar)
| |ACB 69: Young Eagles 22 
| 
| align=center| 2
| align=center| 1:34
| Almaty, Kazakhstan
|
|-
| Win
| align=center| 23-9-1
| Jani Salmi
| Submission (brabo choke)
| Fight Night Finland 14
| 
| align=center| 2
| align=center| 2:27
| Turku, Finland
| Lightweight bout.
|-
| Loss
| align=center| 22-9-1
| Murad Machaev
| Decision (unanimous)
| Mix Fight Combat 4
| 
| align=center| 3
| align=center| 5:00
| Khimki, Russia
| 
|-
| Win
| align=center| 22-8-1
| Jani Ridasmaa
| Submission (brabo choke)
| Lappeenranta Fight Night 14
| 
| align=center| 2
| align=center| 1:51
| Lappeenranta, South Karelia, Finland
| Catchweight (162 lbs) bout.
|-
| Loss
| align=center| 21-8-1
| Filip Wolanski
| Decision (majority)
| Incredible Fighting Night 1 - Let's Begin
| 
| align=center| 3
| align=center| 5:00
| Częstochowa, Poland
| 
|-
| Loss
| align=center| 21-7-1
| Magomed Idrisov
| Decision (unanimous)
| M-1 Challenge 61 - Battle of Narts
| 
| align=center| 3
| align=center| 5:00
| Nazran, Ingushetia, Russia 
| Return to Featherweight.
|-
| Win
| align=center| 21-6-1
| Antti Virtanen
| Submission (heelhook)
| Lappeenranta Fight Night 12
| 
| align=center| 1
| align=center| 2:36
| Lappeenranta, Finland
| Catchweight (161 lbs) bout.
|-
| Loss
| align=center| 20-6-1
| Anton Kuivanen
| Decision (unanimous)
| Cage 29
| 
| align=center| 3
| align=center| 5:00
| Helsinki, Finland
| 
|-
|  Win
| align=center| 20-5-1
| Jakub Kowalewicz
| Decision (unanimous)
| KSW 26: Materla vs. Silva 3
| 
| align=center| 3
| align=center| 5:00
| Warsaw, Poland
| Lightweight debut.
|-
|  Win
| align=center| 19-5-1
| Rasul Albaskhanov 
| Submission (anaconda choke)
| ACB 1: Grand Prix Berkut 2014
| 
| align=center| 2
| align=center| 0:48
| Grozny, Russia
| 
|-
|  Win
| align=center| 18-5-1
| Zokir Poechev
| TKO (punches)
| Oplot Challenge 98
| 
| align=center| 2
| align=center| 2:10
| Kharkov, Ukraine
| 
|-
|  Win
| align=center| 17-5-1
| Murad Zeinulabidov
| Submission (rear naked choke)
| Oplot Challenge 86
| 
| align=center| 2
| align=center| 3:42
| Kharkov, Ukraine
| 
|-
|  Win
| align=center| 16-5-1
| Jorgen Matsi
| Submission (rear naked choke)
| MMA Raju 12
| 
| align=center| 3
| align=center| 2:22
| Tartu, Estonia
| Catchweight (148 lbs) bout.
|-
|  Win
| align=center| 15-5-1
| Rashid Aliev
| Submission (d'arce choke)
| Oplot Challenge 83
| 
| align=center| 1
| align=center| 3:10
| Kharkov, Ukraine
| 
|-
|  Win
| align=center| 14-5-1
| Artem Kazerskij
| Submission (rear naked choke)
| Real Fights 15
| 
| align=center| 1
| align=center| 0:32
| Vilnius, Lithuania
| 
|-
|  Win
| align=center| 13-5-1
| Joni Salovaara
| Submission (rear naked choke)
| Espoo Fight Night
| 
| align=center| 1
| align=center| N/A
| Espoo, Finland
| 
|-
|  Win
| align=center| 12-5-1
| Sebastian Grabarek
| Submission (rear naked choke)
| MMA Attack 2
| 
| align=center| 2
| align=center| 3:01
| Katowice, Poland
| 
|-
|  Loss
| align=center| 11-5-1
| Niklas Bäckström
| Decision (unanimous)
| Botnia Punishment 11 
| 
| align=center| 3
| align=center| 5:00
| Seinajoki, Finland
| 
|-
|  Win
| align=center| 11-4-1
| Oliver Pastor
| Decision (unanimous)
| OTP: On Top 4
| 
| align=center| 3
| align=center| 5:00
| Belfast, Northern Ireland
| 
|-
|  Win
| align=center| 10-4-1
| Magomed Muhumaev
| Submission (triangle choke)
| Baltic Challenge 2
| 
| align=center| 1
| align=center| 1:32
| Kaliningrad, Russia
| 
|-
|  Win
| align=center| 9-4-1
| Marcos Nardini
| Decision (unanimous)
| OTP: On Top 2
| 
| align=center| 3
| align=center| 5:00
| Glasgow, Scotland
| 
|-
|  Loss
| align=center| 8-4-1
| Tom Niinimäki
| Decision (unanimious)
| Cage 14: All Stars
| 
| align=center| 3
| align=center| 5:00
| Espoo, Finland
| 
|-
|  Loss
| align=center| 8-3-1
| Jason Young
| Decision (unanimous)
| Cage Warriors 38: Young Guns
| 
| align=center| 3
| align=center| 5:00
| London, England
| 
|-
|  Win
| align=center| 8-2-1
| Ville Yrjola
| Submission (triangle choke)
| Cage 13: Spring Break
| 
| align=center| 1
| align=center| 0:46
| Vantaa, Finland
| 
|-
|  Win
| align=center| 7-2-1
| Jerry Kvarnstrom
| Submission (triangle choke)
| Turku Fight: Resurrection
| 
| align=center| 1
| align=center| 1:03
| Turku, Finland
| 
|-
|  Win
| align=center| 6-2-1
| John Cullen
| Submission (rear naked choke)
| Eurofight Xtreme FC 1
| 
| align=center| 1
| align=center| 0:35
| Glasgow, Scotland
| 
|-
|  Win
| align=center| 5-2-1
| Juris Karpenko
| Submission (rear naked choke)
| Real Fights 4
| 
| align=center| 1
| align=center| 0:48
| Kaunas, Lithuania
| 
|-
|  Win
| align=center| 4-2-1
| Owen Roddy
| Submission (achilles lock)
| Ultimate Conflict 1
| 
| align=center| 1
| align=center| 4:31
| Dublin, Ireland
| 
|-
|  Win
| align=center| 3-2-1
| Olli Hartikainen
| Submission (triangle choke)
| Carelia Fight 3
| 
| align=center| 2
| align=center| 1:45
| Helsinki, Finland
| 
|-
|  Loss
| align=center| 2-2-1
| Arsen Timerkhanov
| Submission (armbar)
| K-1 Hero's Lithuania 2006
| 
| align=center| 1
| align=center| 1:21
| Vilnius, Lithuania
| 
|-
|  Win
| align=center| 2-1-1
| Masahiro Oishi
| TKO (head kick and punches)
| Zst 10
| 
| align=center| 1
| align=center| 0:31
| Tokyo, Japan
| 
|-
|  Loss
| align=center| 1-1-1
| Masayuki Okude
| Submission (armbar)
| Shooto Lithuania: Bushido
| 
| align=center| 1
| align=center| 4:57
| Vilnius, Lithuania
| 
|-
|  Win
| align=center| 1-0-1
| Povilas Alaburda
| Submission (leglock)
| Shooto Lithuania: Auksta Itampa 2
| 
| align=center| 1
| align=center| 2:31
| Kaunas, Lithuania
| 
|-
| Draw
| align=center| 0-0-1
| Masayuki Okude
| Draw
| Zst 7
| 
| align=center| 2
| align=center| 5:00
| Tokyo, Japan
|

References

External links

Delfi.lt Sergejus Grečicho 

Living people
Lithuanian male mixed martial artists
Lightweight mixed martial artists
Lithuanian sambo practitioners
Lithuanian practitioners of Brazilian jiu-jitsu
Mixed martial artists utilizing sambo
Mixed martial artists utilizing pankration
Mixed martial artists utilizing Brazilian jiu-jitsu
Sportspeople from Vilnius
1985 births